Alfonso Rodríguez (born 30 May 1929) is a Colombian former sports shooter. He competed in two events at the 1972 Summer Olympics.

References

External links
 

1929 births
Possibly living people
Colombian male sport shooters
Olympic shooters of Colombia
Shooters at the 1972 Summer Olympics
Place of birth missing (living people)